In most classifications, the Eastern Sudanic languages are a group of nine families of languages that may constitute a branch of the Nilo-Saharan language family. Eastern Sudanic languages are spoken from southern Egypt to northern Tanzania.

Nubian (and possibly Meroitic) gives Eastern Sudanic some of the earliest written attestations of African languages. However, the largest branch by far is Nilotic, spread by extensive and comparatively recent conquests throughout East Africa. Before the spread of Nilotic, Eastern Sudanic was centered in present-day Sudan. The name "East Sudanic" refers to the eastern part of the region of Sudan where the country of Sudan is located, and contrasts with Central Sudanic and Western Sudanic (modern Mande, in the Niger–Congo family).

Lionel Bender (1980) proposes several Eastern Sudanic isoglosses (defining words), such as *kutuk "mouth", *(ko)TVS-(Vg) "three", and *ku-lug-ut or *kVl(t) "fish".

In older classifications, such as that of Meinhof (1911), the term was used for the eastern Sudanic languages, largely equivalent to modern Nilo-Saharan sans Nilotic, which is the largest constituent of modern Eastern Sudanic.

Glottolog (2013) does not accept that a relationship has been demonstrated between any of the nine families of Eastern Sudanic, nor their connection to a broader Nilo-Saharan phylum.

Güldemann (2018) considers East Sudanic to be undemonstrated at the current state of research. He only accepts the evidence for a connection between the Nilotic and Surmic languages as "robust", while he states that Rilly's evidence (see below) for the northern group comprising Nubian, Nara, Nyima, Taman and Meroitic "certainly look[s] promising".

In an automated computational analysis (ASJP 4) by Müller et al. (2013), Surmic, Nara, and Daju are grouped together, while Nyimang, Temein are also grouped together. However, since the analysis was automatically generated, the groupings could be either due to mutual lexical borrowing or genetic inheritance.

Internal classification
There are several different classifications of East Sudanic languages.

Bender (2000)
Lionel Bender assigns the languages into two branches, depending on whether the 1sg pronoun ("I") has a /k/ or an /n/:

Rilly (2009)
Claude Rilly (2009:2) provides the following internal structure for the Eastern Sudanic languages.

Starostin (2015)
Starostin, using lexicostatistics, finds strong support for Bender's Northern branch, but none for the Southern branch.  Eastern Sudanic as a whole is rated a probable working model, pending proper comparative work, while the relationship between Nubian, Tama, and Nara is beyond reasonable doubt. 

Nyima is not part of the northern group, though it appears to be closest to it.  (For one thing, its pronouns align well with the northern (Astaboran) branches.)  Surmic, Nilotic, and Temein share a number of similarities, including in their pronouns, but not enough to warrant classifying them together in opposition to Astaboran without proper comparative work. Jebel and Daju also share many similarities with Surma and Nilotic, though their pronominal systems are closer to Astaboran.

Inclusion of Kuliak and Berta is not supported.  Similarities with Kuliak may be due to both being Nilo-Saharan families, whereas Berta and Jebel form a sprachbund.

A similar classification was given in Starostin (2014):

 Tama-Nara-Nubian branch
 Tama
 Nara-Nubian
 Nara
 Nubian
 Surmic branch
 Northern Surmic (= Majang)
 Southern Surmic
 Southwest Surmic
 Southeast Surmic
 Nilotic branch
 Northern Nilotic
 Western Nilotic
 Eastern Nilotic
 Southern Nilotic
 Daju
 Nyimang
 Temein
 Jebel

Blench (2019)
Roger Blench (2019) proposes the following internal structure for East Sudanic, supported by morphological evidence.

Dimmendaal & Jakobi (2020)
Eastern Sudanic classification from Dimmendaal & Jakobi (2020:394):

Numerals
Comparison of numerals in individual languages (excluding Nilotic and Surmic languages):

References

Bibliography

 Bender, M. Lionel. 2000. "Nilo-Saharan". In: Bernd Heine and Derek Nurse (eds.), African Languages: An Introduction. Cambridge University Press.
 Bender, M. Lionel. 1981. "Some Nilo-Saharan isoglosses". In: Thilo Schadeberg, M. L. Bender (eds.), Nilo-Saharan: Proceedings of the First Nilo-Saharan Linguistics Colloquium, Leiden, Sept. 8-10, 1980. Dordrecht: Foris Publications.
 Temein languages (Roger Blench, 2007).

Starostin, George. 2015. Proto-East Sudanic ʽtreeʼ on the East Sudanic tree. 10th Annual Conference on Comparative-Historical Linguistics (in memory of Sergei Starostin).

Proposed language families